Heteropsis angolensis is a butterfly in the family Nymphalidae. It is found in Angola.

References

Elymniini
Butterflies described in 1994
Endemic fauna of Angola
Butterflies of Africa